Albert Barthélémy (3 March 1906 – 26 November 1988) was a French racing cyclist. He rode in three editions of the Tour de France: 1929, 1930 and 1932.

Major results

1928
 1st Grand Prix de Fourmies
 3rd Paris–Fourmies
1929
 1st Grand Prix de Fourmies
 1st Paris–Fourmies
 2nd 
1930
 1st Overall Circuit des Ardennes
 1st Grand Prix de Fourmies
 2nd Paris–Fourmies
 3rd 
1931
 1st Stages 6, 7, 10 & 11 Tour of Germany
 3rd Grand Prix de Fourmies
1932
 1st Overall 
1st Stages 1 & 2
 1st 
 1st 
 2nd Grand Prix de Fourmies
1933
 1st Paris–Brussels
1934
 1st Circuit de la Vallée de l'Aa

References

1906 births
1988 deaths
French male cyclists